Rufus B. Atwood (1897-1983) was the sixth and longest-serving president of Kentucky State University in Frankfort, Kentucky. He was one of the first African-Americans to hold a high position at a major academic institution.

Early life 
Born Rufus Ballad Atwood in Hickman, Kentucky, he attended Fisk Academy and Fisk University in Nashville, Tennessee, graduating in 1920 with a bachelor's degree in biology after interrupting his studies to serve a volunteer enlistment in the United States Army during World War I where he received a Bronze Star Award. Atwood also received a bachelor's degree from Iowa State University in 1923 and his master's degree from University of Chicago.

Career 
In 1923, Atwood became professor (and later dean) of agriculture at Prairie View State Normal and Industrial College in Texas, and in 1929 he accepted the presidency of Kentucky State College for Colored Persons where he remained until 1962, gaining the title of the longest-serving president of Kentucky State University for his 33 years of service. Under his administration, Kentucky State achieved accreditation as a four-year college. Atwood was awarded honorary degrees from Lane College and Monrovia College and Industrial Institute, and in 1962 he was awarded the Algernon Sydney Sullivan Citizen Medallion.

During the 1940s and 1950s when schools were being desegregated, causing the closure of black-only schools, Atwood fought hard to keep Kentucky State open, relevant, and expanding. Five months after the May 1954 Supreme Court decision outlawing segregation, Kentucky State enrolled its first white student. Kentucky State University's Atwood Institute for Race, Education, and the Democratic Ideal is named for him.

References 

Heads of universities and colleges in the United States
Iowa State University alumni
Fisk University alumni
University of Chicago alumni
Prairie View A&M University people
Kentucky State University people
American academic administrators
Burials at Frankfort Cemetery
People from Fulton County, Kentucky
African-American academics
1897 births
1983 deaths
20th-century African-American people
20th-century American academics